Michael J. Lutton is a United States Air Force major general who serves as the Commander of the Twentieth Air Force. Previously, he was the Deputy Director for Nuclear and Homeland Defense Operations of the Joint Staff.

References

External links

Year of birth missing (living people)
Living people
Place of birth missing (living people)
United States Air Force generals